Cesare Seassaro (25 March 1891 in Pavia – 15 November 1921) was a socialist publicist. Author in 1918 of Cooperazione e municipalizzazione. La personalità giuridica dell’azienda municipalizzata.

After the Great War, Cesare Seassaro was a socialist–catholic and ex-combatant. Later he turned more to the left and became one of the early Italian communists. Already in 1919 he wrote for the weekly L'Ordine Nuovo founded in Turin on May Day 1919 by Antonio Gramsci (1891–1937).

As director of the Il Lavoratore from Trieste, he came in Fiume to give "organisational support" from the Communist Party of Italy in building the Communist Party of Fiume, where he died in his sleep of gas intoxication.

References

1891 births
1921 deaths
Writers from Pavia